Lubasz ) is a village in Czarnków-Trzcianka County, Greater Poland Voivodeship, in west-central Poland. It is the seat of the gmina (administrative district) called Gmina Lubasz.

The village has a population of 2,500.

References

Lubasz